Whitewater Township is one of ten townships in Cape Girardeau County, Missouri, USA.  As of the 2000 census, its population was 1,263.

History
Whitewater Township was founded in 1852. The township took its name from the Whitewater River.

Geography
It contains thirteen cemeteries: Baker, Estes, Gladish, Kurre, Mayfield, Miller, Old Caney Fork, Old Niswonger, Riehn, Schmidt, Snyder, Wilkinson and Wise.

The streams of Caney Fork, Crawford Creek, Dry Creek, Little Muddy Creek, Panther Creek, Sandy Branch and Wolf Creek run through this township.

References

 USGS Geographic Names Information System (GNIS)

External links
 US-Counties.com
 City-Data.com

Townships in Cape Girardeau County, Missouri
Cape Girardeau–Jackson metropolitan area
Townships in Missouri